Acaciella villosa is a species of legume in the family Fabaceae. It is found only in Jamaica.

References

villosa
Trees of Jamaica
Vulnerable plants
Taxonomy articles created by Polbot